Philip Dean Salt (born 28 August 1996) is a professional cricketer, who plays internationally for England and domestically for Lancashire County Cricket Club, and previously for Sussex. Primarily an aggressive right-handed opening batsman, he sometimes keeps wicket and, less frequently, bowls right-arm medium-pace. Salt made his international debut for England in July 2021. Born in Wales, he moved in his youth to Barbados and then to England. Salt was part of the England team that won the 2022 ICC T20 World Cup.

Early life
Salt was born in Bodelwyddan, Wales. He began playing cricket in St Asaph and played for the North East Wales Under-11s. He attended school in Chester, and when he was 10 years old his family moved to Barbados. As a result, he met the Barbados residency requirement, and so was eligible to play for either England or the West Indies. Whilst in Barbados he played with future Sussex and England colleague Jofra Archer. Salt returned to the United Kingdom at the age of 15, when he attended the Reed's School on a cricket scholarship.

Domestic career
In 2013, Salt played for Guildford Cricket Club, before being signed to the Sussex Academy for the 2014 season. Salt played Second XI matches as well as playing in the 2014 Sussex Cricket League Premier Division for a Sussex Cricket Board Development XI, and also Brighton & Hove. In the Sussex Premier League, Salt scored 200* from 129 balls in a match against Horsham, as well as 147* against the Preston Nomads, and 51 from 33 balls against the league's eventual winners, Roffey. In August 2014, he was awarded the Player of the Month trophy.

Salt was retained by Sussex for the 2015 season, and scored 72 from 52 balls in a May 2015 Sussex Premier League match against Cuckfield Cricket Club. He also represented Brighton and Hove, and top-scoring for them with 39 in a match against Middleton. In June 2015, he scored 43 in a Sussex second XI match against Surrey, in a Sussex team including Mahela Jayawardene and Ashar Zaidi. Salt made his List A debut in a 2015 Royal London One-Day Cup match against Essex; he was the 29th different player to play for Sussex in the 2015 Royal London One-Day Cup. Opening the batting, Salt scored 22 from 20 balls; the match was eventually a no result due to rain.

Prior to the beginning of the 2016 season, Salt was awarded a junior professional contract. He made his Twenty20 debut on 20 May 2016 for Sussex against Gloucestershire in the 2016 NatWest t20 Blast. On 8 July 2016 he made his first-class debut for Sussex during Pakistan's tour of England.

On 10 September 2019, Salt signed for Adelaide Strikers as one of their overseas players for the 2019–20 Big Bash League season.

Salt missed the start of the 2021 County Championship season due to a broken foot. Salt announced a move from Sussex to Lancashire CCC for the 2022 season. In April 2022, he was bought by the Manchester Originals for the 2022 season of The Hundred.

He was bought by Delhi Capitals to play in the 2023 IPL season for INR 20 million (2 crore, £200,000) in the IPL auction held on 23 December 2022.

International career
In May 2019, Salt was added to England's Twenty20 International (T20I) squad for the one-off match against Pakistan, replacing an injured Dawid Malan, but did not play.

In July 2021, having previously trained with the squad earlier in the summer, Salt was named in England's ODI squad for their series against Pakistan, after the original squad for the tour was forced to withdraw following positive tests for COVID-19. Salt made his ODI debut on 8 July 2021, for England against Pakistan. In December 2021, Salt was named in England's Twenty20 International (T20I) squad for their series against the West Indies. He made his T20I debut on 26 January 2022, for England against the West Indies.

In June 2022, in the opening match against the Netherlands, Salt scored his first century in ODI cricket, with 122 runs. During the match, England scored 498 runs, the highest score in ODI and List-A history, with Salt being one of three centurions alongside Dawid Malan and Jos Buttler.

On 13 November 2022, Salt won the 2022 T20 World Cup with England. He made two appearances at the tournament, playing in both the semi-final and final of the competition.

References

External links
 

1996 births
Living people
Welsh cricketers
England One Day International cricketers
England Twenty20 International cricketers
Sportspeople from Denbighshire
Sussex cricketers
Lahore Qalandars cricketers
Islamabad United cricketers
Barbados Royals cricketers
People educated at Reed's School
Adelaide Strikers cricketers
Manchester Originals cricketers
Dambulla Aura cricketers